Thelma Holt  (born 4 January 1932) is a British theatre producer and former actress.

After a successful career as an actress, in partnership with Charles Marowitz, Thelma founded the Open Space Theatre in Tottenham Court Road, London, which became the forerunner of the London fringe. In 1977, joined The Round House in Chalk Farm as Artistic and Executive Director. There she instigated a policy of bringing the best of regional theatre to London: Citizens Theatre (Glasgow), Royal Exchange Theatre Company (Manchester), Stephen Joseph Theatre Company, Scarborough.

She gave London the opportunity to see some of the successful productions initiated at the Edinburgh Festival.  Other visiting companies included: Josef Szanja (Poland), The Pickle Family Circus (USA), Circus Oz (Australia), Antoine Vitez (France), Rustaveli Theatre Company (Georgia, CIS).

From 1977–83 Holt was artistic director at the Round House. In 1983 The Round House closed and Thelma Holt joined the Theatre of Comedy as executive producer, where she produced Loot by Joe Orton, directed by Jonathan Lynn and starring Leonard Rossiter. (For further information on Holt at both the Open Space and at the Round House, see (Vaulting Ambitions by Jennie Schiele, published in 2004.)

Work with the National Theatre
In 1985 Holt joined the National Theatre as head of Touring and Commercial Exploitation. She was responsible for the following NT West End transfers: A Chorus of Disapproval, The Petition, Brighton Beach Memoirs, Three Men on a Horse and A View from the Bridge.  She was also responsible for major tours of National Theatre productions to: Paris, Vienna, Zurich, North America, Moscow, Tbilisi, Tokyo, Epidavros.

Holt produced INTERNATIONAL 87, a series of four visits to the National Theatre by international theatre companies: The Hairy Ape by Eugene O'Neill directed by Peter Stein (production from the Schaubühne, Berlin), Miss Julie by August Strindberg and Hamlet by William Shakespeare both directed by Ingmar Bergman (Productions from the Royal Dramatic Theatre, Stockholm), Macbeth by William Shakespeare and Medea by Euripides both directed by Yukio Ninagawa (the Ninagawa Company from Tokyo), Tomorrow was War by the Mayakovsky Theatre Company from Moscow. For this international season Holt received the Olivier/Observer Award for Outstanding Achievement in the Theatre and a special award from Drama Magazine. In 1998 she co-produced The Fairy-Queen by Purcell, directed by Adrian Noble for the Aix-en-Provence Festival.

Thelma Holt produced INTERNATIONAL 89, a second series of four visits to the National Theatre by international theatre companies: Tango Varsoviano by Teatro del Sur (Buenos Aires), Grapes of Wrath by the Steppenwolf Theatre Company (Chicago), Uncle Vanya by Anton Chekhov from the Moscow Art Theatre and Suicide for Love the return of the Ninagawa Theatre Company.

Work with the Peter Hall Company

For the newly formed Peter Hall Company, Holt was Executive Producer for: Orpheus Descending by Tennessee Williams (cast included Vanessa Redgrave), presented at the Theatre Royal, Haymarket, The Merchant of Venice by William Shakespeare (cast included Dustin Hoffman) presented at the Phoenix Theatre, London and in New York, The Wild Duck by Henrik Ibsen (cast included Alex Jennings, David Threlfall, Nichola McAuliffe) presented at the Phoenix Theatre, London.

Holt was executive producer for Triumph Proscenium's production of Pirandello's Henry IV starring Richard Harris, which was presented in 1990 at Wyndham's Theatre, London.  In 1990 she also presented two visiting productions at the National Theatre: Hamlet by William Shakespeare (the Bulandra Theatre Company from Bucharest), The Kingdom of Desire based on Shakespeare's Macbeth (the Contemporary Legend Theatre from Taiwan).

Thelma Holt Limited

1990–1999
1990
 Three Sisters by Anton Chekhov in a new version by Nikolas Simmonds, directed by Robert Sturua, cast included: Vanessa Redgrave, Lynn Redgrave and Jemma Redgrave, presented at the Queen's Theatre
 Tango at the End of Winter by Shimizu in a version by Peter Barnes, directed by Yukio Ninagawa, cast included Alan Rickman, presented at the Piccadilly Theatre

1991

 Electra by Sophocles, RSC production directed by Deborah Warner, cast included Fiona Shaw in the title role, presented at Riverside Studios follows by a tour to Bobigny (France), Bradford (Transport Museum), Derry (Sports Centre) and Glasgow (Tramway)

1992

 Hamlet by William Shakespeare, directed by Robert Sturua, cast included Alan Rickman in the title role, presented at Riverside Studios and on tour in the UK
 Les Atride directed by Ariane Mnouchkine, production from Le Theatre du Soleil, Paris, presented at Robin Mills, Bradford as part of the European Arts Festival
 Le baruffe chiozzotte directed by Giorgio Strehler, production from Piccolo Theatre, Milan, presented at the Royal National Theatre
 Six Characters in Search of an Author by Pirandello, directed by Franco Zeffirelli, presented at the Royal National Theatre
 The Tempest by William Shakespeare, directed by Yukio Ninagawa, Ninagawa Company presented at the Barbican Theatre, London

1993

 Medea by Euripides, directed by Yukio Ninagawa, Ninagawa Company in association with Point Tokyo Co. Ltd., presented in Zurich, Switzerland
 Much Ado About Nothing by William Shakespeare, directed by Matthew Warchus, cast included Mark Rylance and Janet McTeer, presented at the Queen's Theatre. Production awarded the Sir Tyrone Guthrie Award for Best Production at the Shakespeare Globe Classic Awards.

1994

 Peer Gynt by Henrik Ibsen in a version by Frank McGuinness, directed by Yukio Ninagawa, cast included Michael Sheen in the title role. World Tour including premiere performances at the Winter Olympics in Norway.
 The Clandestine Marriage by George Colman & Garrick, directed by Nigel Hawthorne, cast included Nigel Hawthorne, presented at the Queen's Theatre, London.

1995

 The Seagull by Anton Chekhov, directed by Robert Sturua, cast included Deborah Findlay, Michael Sheen and Kate Beckinsale. Regional UK Tour.
 A Midsummer Night's Dream by William Shakespeare, directed by Yukio Ninagawa. Ninagawa Company presented at Plymouth Pavilions and at Newcastle Playhouse.
 Anthony and Cleopatra by William Shakespeare, directed by Vanessa Redgrave, cast included Vanessa Redgrave, David Harewood.  Riverside Studios and Regional UK tour.
 The Glass Menagerie by Tennessee Williams, directed by Sam Mendes, cast included Zoë Wanamaker. Donmar Warehouse production transfer to Comedy Theatre.

1996

 Observe the Sons of Ulster Marching Towards the Somme by Frank McGuinness, directed by Patrick Mason.  Abbey Theatre, Dublin production presented at the Barbican Theatre and on tour
 A Midsummer Night's Dream by William Shakespeare, directed by Yukio Ninagawa. Return of Ninagawa Company production to Mermaid Theatre, London
 A Doll's House by Henrik Ibsen in a version by Frank McGuinness, directed by Anthony Page, presented as a regional UK tour followed by a season at the Playhouse Theatre, London and subsequently in association with Bill Kenwright at the Belasco Theatre, New York. Cast included Janet McTeer, Owen Teale. Tony Award for Best Actress in a Play, (Janet McTeer). Tony Award for Best Supporting Actor (Owen Teale). Tony Award for Best Direction of a Play (Anthony Page). Tony Award for Best Revival of a Play (Thelma Holt/Bill Kenwright)

1997

 The Maids by Jean Genet, directed by John Crowley. Regional tour of Donmar Warehouse production
 Les Fausses Confidences by Marivaux.  Comédie-Française production presented at the Royal National Theatre
 Oh Les Beaux Jours by Samuel Beckett directed by Peter Brook. Presented at Riverside Studios
 Shintoku Maru, directed by Yukio Ninagawa, cast included Tatsuya Fujiwara.  Ninagawa Company at the Barbican Theatre

1998

 The Relapse by John Vanburgh, directed and designed by Philip Prowse. Citizens Theatre, Glasgow and UK tour
 Hamlet by William Shakespeare directed by Yukio Ninagawa. Hiroyuki Sanada in the title.  Presented at the Barbican Theatre as part of BITE season

1999

 Cleo, Camping, Emmanuelle and Dick by Terry Johnson, directed by Terry Johnson. Royal National Theatre production presented on UK tour
 Macbeth by William Shakespeare, directed by John Crowley, cast included Rufus Sewell in the title role. Presented at the Queen's Theatre
 King Lear by William Shakespeare directed by Yukio Ninagawa, cast included Nigel Hawthorne in the title role. Royal Shakespeare Company production in association with HoriPro Inc. presented in Tokyo, London and in Stratford-upon-Avon

2000–2015 

2000

 Miss Julie by August Strindberg in a version by Frank McGuinness directed by Michael Boyd. Cast included Christopher Eccleston, Aisling O'Sullivan, Maxine Peake. Presented at the Theatre Royal Haymarket.

2001

 Semi-Monde by Noël Coward directed and designed by Philip Prowse. London premiere production presented at the Lyric Theatre, London.
 Sotoba Komachi and Yoroboshi by Yukio Mishima directed by Yukio Ninagawa cast included Tatsuya Fujiwara. Ninagawa Company presented at the Barbican Theatre, London as part of BITE: 01.

2002

 Via Dolorosa by David Hare directed by Stephen Daldry. David Hare in award-winning one-man show at the Duchess Theatre in association with Bill Kenwright.
 The Tempest by William Shakespeare directed by Patrick Mason cast included Richard Briers. UK tour in association with Theatre Royal, Plymouth (Stage 1 of Arts Council Three Year Initiative). The musical score was composed by Tom Foster-Carter.

2002/03

 The Jacobeans – West End presentation at the Gielgud Theatre in association with Bill Kenwright of RSC productions.
 The Island Princess by John Fletcher.
 The Malcontent by John Marston.
 The Roman Actor by Philip Massinger.
 Eastward Ho! by Ben Jonson, John Marston, George Chapman.
 Edward III by William Shakespeare.  Olivier Special Award to the Acting Ensemble 2003.

2003

 Pericles by William Shakespeare directed by Yukio Ninagawa.  Ninagawa Company at the Royal National Theatre.
 Ghosts by Henrik Ibsen directed by Ingmar Bergman. Royal Dramaten Theatre, Stockholm production presented at the Barbican Theatre as part of BITE:03.
 Hamlet by William Shakespeare directed by Jonathan Kent. HoriPro Inc. production presented at Sadler's Wells Theatre, London.
 The Taming of The Shrew by William Shakespeare directed by Mark Rosenblatt, cast included Nichola McAuliffe and Ross Kemp. UK tour in association with Theatre Royal Plymouth (Stage 2 of Arts Council Three Year Initiative).

2004

 The Taming of the Shrew by William Shakespeare in repertoire with The Tamer Tamed by John Fletcher directed by Gregory Doran RSC productions presented in association with Bill Kenwright at the Queen's Theatre, London.
 All's Well That Ends Well by William Shakespeare directed by Gregory Doran cast included Judi Dench. RSC production presented in association with Bill Kenwright at the Gielgud Theatre, London.
 Othello by William Shakespeare directed by Gregory Doran cast included Antony Sher. RSC production presented on tour in Japan in association with HoriPro Inc.
 We Happy Few by Imogen Stubbs directed by Trevor Nunn cast included Juliet Stevenson. Presented in association with Bill Kenwright at the Gielgud Theatre, London.
 Hamlet by William Shakespeare directed by Yukio Ninagawa cast included Michael Maloney in the title role. UK tour and presentation at Barbican Theatre as part of BITE: 04 in association with Theatre Royal Plymouth (Stage 3 of Arts Council Three Year Initiative).

2005

 Man and Boy by Terence Rattigan directed by Maria Aitken with David Suchet in the leading role. Yvonne Arnaud Theatre, Guildford.
 Primo by Primo Levi adapted by Antony Sher and directed by Richard Wilson. Solo performance by Antony Sher National Theatre production presented in association with Bill Kenwright at the Music Box, New York. Outer Critics' Circle Award for Solo Performance.
 Twelfth Night by William Shakespeare directed by Patrick Mason with Matthew Kelly as Malvolio. UK tour in association with Theatre Royal Plymouth.
 A Midsummer Night's Dream by William Shakespeare directed by Gregory Doran. Tour to Tokyo Metropolitan Art Space, Japan. RSC production presented in association with HoriPro Inc. and Metropolitan Art Space, Tokyo.

2006

 The Crucible by Arthur Miller directed by Dominic Cooke with Iain Glen in the principal role. RSC production presented in association with Bill Kenwright at the Gielgud Theatre.
 Hay Fever by Noël Coward directed by Peter Hall with Judi Dench and Peter Bowles. Produced in association with Bill Kenwright at Theatre Royal Haymarket, London.
 Breakfast With Mugabe by Fraser Grace directed by Antony Sher (debut as director) at Duchess Theatre. RSC production presented in association with Nica Burns.
 Titus Andronicus by William Shakespeare directed by Yukio Ninagawa. Presented in association with HoriPro Inc. Royal Shakespeare Theatre and Theatre Royal Plymouth. Part of RSC Complete Works Festival.
 The Canterbury Tales by Geoffrey Chaucer, a new adaptation in two parts by Mike Poulton. An RSC production of an RSC Commission directed by Gregory Doran, Rebecca Gatward & Jonathan Munby. Presented at the Gielgud Theatre in association with Bill Kenwright.

2007

 Coriolanus by William Shakespeare directed by Yukio Ninagawa. Presented in association with HoriPro Inc. at the Barbican Theatre as part of BITE 2007.
 Kean by Jean-Paul Sartre. Antony Sher in the title role directed by Adrian Noble. Presented in association with Anthony Field and John C. Causebrook at the Apollo Theatre.
 The Giant by Antony Sher directed by Gregory Doran. In association with Hampstead Theatre and by arrangement with the RSC at the Hampstead Theatre.

2009

 Measure for Measure by William Shakespeare directed by Jamie Glover with Alistair McGowan and Jason Merrells. UK tour in association with Theatre Royal Plymouth.
 Twelfth Night after William Shakespeare directed by Yukio Ninagawa. Presented in association with Shochiku Grand Kabuki at the Barbican Theatre as part of bite 2009.
 The English Samurai by Mike Poulton & Shoichiro Kawai directed by Gregory Doran. In association with HoriPro Inc. at the Galaxy Theatre, Tokyo.

2010

 Ghosts by Henrik Ibsen in a version by Frank McGuinness directed by Iain Glen at the Duchess Theatre.
 Bedroom Farce by Alan Ayckbourn directed by Peter Hall. Presented in association with Bill Kenwright at the Duke of York's Theatre.
 Musashi by Inoue Hisashi directed by Yukio Ninagawa. In association with HoriPro Inc. at the Barbican Theatre as part of bite 2010.

2011

 Ruby Wax: Losing It in a co-production with the Menier Chocolate Factory, at the Duchess Theatre.

2012

 Cymbeline by William Shakespeare, directed by Yukio Ninagawa. Produced in association with HoriPro Inc. at the Barbican Theatre as part of bite 2012.
 Written on the Heart by David Edgar, directed by Gregory Doran. RSC production presented in association with Bill Kenwright and Nica Burns at the Duchess Theatre.
 Volcano by Noël Coward, produced in association with Bill Kenwright. UK tour and at the Vaudeville Theatre.
 All That Fall by Samuel Beckett, directed by Trevor Nunn. Jermyn Street Theatre production presented in association with Richard Darbourne at the Arts Theatre.

2013

 Anjin – The Shogun & The English Samurai by Mike Poulton and Sho Kawai, directed by Gregory Doran. Produced in association with HoriPro Inc. in Japan and at Sadlers Wells Theatre.

2014
 
 Forbidden Broadway transfer to Vaudeville Theatre of Menier Chocolate Factory production for limited season.
 
2015
 
 Hamlet by William Shakespeare and Kafka on the Shore based on the work of Haruki Murakami adapted by Frank Galati, directed by Yukio Ninagawa, presented at Barbican Theatre in association with HoriPro Inc.

2017
 Macbeth by William Shakespeare, original production by Yukio Ninagawa presented at the Barbican Theatre in association with Horipro Inc.
 
2018
 Imperium by Robert Harris, adapted by Mike Poulton, directed by Gregory Doran, Royal Shakespeare Company production with Playful Productions Ltd. at the Gielgud Theatre 
 Don Quixote by Miguel de Cervantes adapted by James Fenton, directed by Angus Jackson, Royal Shakespeare Company production with Nimax Theatres at the Garrick Theatre

Honours and awards
 Olivier/Observer Award – Outstanding Achievement (1987)
 Shakespeare Globe Classic Awards –  Tyrone Guthrie Award for Best Production (1993) (Much Ado About Nothing)
 Tony Award (with Bill Kenwright) – Best Revival (1996) (A Doll's House)
 CBE – Queen's Birthday Honours List (1994)
 Award for Excellence in International Theatre – British International Theatre Institute (1994)
 Order of the Rising Sun, Gold Rays with Rosette (2004) – presented by Japanese government
 Distinguished Friend of Oxford University (2006)
 Theatrical Management Association's Special Award for Individual Achievement (2006)
 The Sam Wanamaker Award, Shakespeare’s Globe (2018)

Positions held
 Yvonne Arnaud Theatre – Chairman (2002 to 2005) subsequently Associate Director.
 Arts Council of England – Member of Council and Chairman of Drama Advisory Panel (1994–1998)
 Royal Academy of Dramatic Art – Member of Council and Member of Finance & General Purposes Committee
 Citizens Theatre, Glasgow – Vice-President.
 Almeida Theatre – Director (2001 to 2009)
 Stage One (formerly Theatre Investment Fund) – Director and Chairman of Young Producers' Bursary Panel
 State of Unrest Theatre Company (dissolved 2003) – Patron
 Oxford University – Cameron Mackintosh Professor Contemporary Theatre (1998)
 Oxford University Dramatic Society – Patron.
 Royal Shakespeare Company – Associate Producer (from 2004)

Commonwealth honours
 Commonwealth honours

Foreign honours
 Foreign honours

Scholastic

 Chancellor, visitor, governor, rector and fellowships

Honorary Degrees
Honorary degrees

References

External links
 Thelma Holt Ltd
 Royal Shakespeare Company

English theatre managers and producers
Women theatre managers and producers
Commanders of the Order of the British Empire
Living people
1932 births
Actresses from Lancashire
Alumni of RADA
Fellows of St Catherine's College, Oxford